Sir (Emil Hugo Oscar) Robert Ropner, 1st Baronet (born Röpner; 16 December 1838 – 26 February 1924) was a German-British shipbuilder, shipowner, and Conservative Member of Parliament.

Career
Ropner was born in 1838 in Magdeburg, Province of Saxony, Kingdom of Prussia, the son of Johann Heinrich Röpner and Johanne Christiane Emilie Bessel. He emigrated to England and worked for a coal export concern before building up a fleet of colliers and founding the Ropner Shipping Company in Hartlepool in 1874.

In 1888, Robert Ropner acquired a shipyard at Stockton-on-Tees in County Durham. Ropner established a successful shipbuilding firm, which built many trunk deck ships. No longer limited to hauling coal, Ropner also established a company to operate tramp steamers.  Although the shipyard went into liquidation soon after what was then known as the Great War, the shipping company continued to operate through both World Wars, despite heavy wartime losses of vessels.

Robert Ropner served as High Sheriff of Durham in 1896 and from 1900 to 1910 represented the constituency of Stockton-on-Tees in the House of Commons. He was President of the UK Chamber of Shipping for 1902.

He was made a Knight Bachelor in the 1902 Birthday Honours and knighted by King Edward VII at Buckingham Palace on 18 December 1902. He was created Baronet of Preston Hall, Stockton-on-Tees, in the County Palatine of Durham, and of Skutterskelfe Hall, Hutton Rudby, in the North Riding of York on 20 August 1904.

Ropner died 26 February 1924, aged 85, and was succeeded in the baronetcy by his eldest son John. His third son William Ropner was the father of the Conservative politician Sir Leonard Ropner, 1st Baronet of Thorp Perrow. Robert Ropner is buried in the family vault at All Saints churchyard, Hutton Rudby, North Yorkshire.

References

Notes

Sources

 Tramping to Success  and Ropners, Owning and Building Ships, Shipping Lines. PortCities Southampton.  Retrieved 2007-11-18.

External links 

1838 births
1924 deaths
Businesspeople from Magdeburg
German emigrants to England
Baronets in the Baronetage of the United Kingdom
Conservative Party (UK) MPs for English constituencies
Knights Bachelor
UK MPs 1900–1906
UK MPs 1906–1910
British businesspeople in shipping
High Sheriffs of Durham
Naturalised citizens of the United Kingdom